This is a list of films which have placed number one at the weekend box office in the United Kingdom during 2020.

Films

Notes

Highest-grossing films

References

External links
Weekend box office figures | BFI

2020
United Kingdom
2020 in British cinema
B